Asse is a town in Belgium. It may also refer to:

 Marquess of Assche
 Theodore van der Noot, 8th Marquess of Assche
 Elisabeth, Countess van der Noot, Countess of Assche
Asse (hills), a chain of hills in Lower Saxony, Germany
Asse (Samtgemeinde), a municipal federation in Lower Saxony, Germany
Asse (river), a river in southeastern France
 Asse Chocolate, Japanese chocolate made by Morinaga & Company, named after the Belgian town
 Asse, an alternate name for the Cape fox
 Schacht Asse II, a repository for radioactive waste in Asse, Germany
 Geneviève Asse (1923–2021), French painter

The acronym ASSE may refer to:
Asse, Administración de los Servicios de Salud del Estado, health care provider in Uruguay
AS Saint-Étienne, a French football club
 American Society of Safety Engineers
 ASSÉ, Association pour une solidarité syndicale étudiante, a student union in Quebec, Canada

See also
 Assen (disambiguation)
 Assens (disambiguation)